Garfield School or Old Garfield School or variations may refer to:

Garfield Elementary School (disambiguation), various places
Garfield Intermediate School, Berkeley, California, listed on the National Register of Historic Places (NRHP) in Alameda County
Garfield School (Boise, Idaho), listed on the NRHP in Ada County
Garfield School (Lewiston, Idaho), listed on the NRHP in Nez Perce County
James A. Garfield School, Detroit, Michigan, listed on the NRHP in Wayne County
Garfield School (Sault Ste. Marie, Michigan), listed on the NRHP in Chippewa County
Garfield School (Billings, Montana), listed on the NRHP in Yellowstone County
Garfield School (Brunswick, New York), listed on the NRHP in Rensselaer County
Old Garfield School (Salem, Oregon), listed on the NRHP in Marion County

See also
Garfield Building (disambiguation)
Garfield House (disambiguation)